The Bznunis are an ancient authority, a nakharars Family in Armenia.

Genealogy

According to ancestral story, which tells us Movses Khorenatsi, the dynasty of Bznunis originates from Baz forefather. Baz was Manavaz Haykazuni's grandson. He inherited the north-western part of Lake Van.  The sea was named after his name Bznunyac and the province Bznuniq. According to other historical evidence, in the northern part of Armenia-Lori, Baz founded the Bazakert province with Bazaberd castle about which there had been numerous references at medieval Armenian historians.

History

The tribe of Bznunis at prior period chaired the position of a royal Leader then a military chief of stuff position. The tribal emblem of the Bznunis was the Hawk, which later had become the tribe's blazon. At the time of Trdat III the Great    they were entrusted the Dzora border mountain pass. The Bznuni nakharars were military commanders and boundary governors. The Bznunis are mentioned in Royal and Military letters. At the times of Khosrov Kotak, the tribe householder Databen Bznuni disobeying the centripetal authorities rebelled against the king. In Arest battle Vache Mamikonyan breaks some of the rebels and the rest escape. Afterwards, Databen Bznuni was brought to the king in chains, and according to the time punishment means he was condemned to death as a traitor, by stoning. However, manorial elite of Bznunis still existed and that loyal house of patriarchal orders still retained the former disobedient and the sovereign lifestyle, so Vache Mamikonyan was given a command to destroy the entire household council which was the part of conspiracy, subsequently the Bznuni possessions were confiscated and joined to the royal estates. Later on, as an occupied province, it had been given to Aghbianos bishop with conferring order, for the church was limited to the pagan architectural lands and with the acquisitions of confiscated domains.  Despite the elimination of the elite tribe, the dynasty of Bznunis was able to maintain their existence in feudal order. In manuscripts from the 6th and 7th centuries Bznuni bishops had been mentioned, we can meet a customer and recipient Bznuni archimandrites, which is indicative of the protection and maintenance of their manorial and aristocratic degrees. Permanently the description of the tribal property location names had been vivid, for example in the 13th century.

Khlat is mentioned as «a city of Bznuni Khlat» and speaking about the destruction of the tribe is definitely understood the elimination of the tribal council of elders and household authorities, because the numerous members of the tribe were connected with relative and other acting ties and were coalesced around all places in the state from centuries. Therefore, the Bznuni nakharars family assignees were rarely mentioned. In the manuscript, records of the 16th and 17th centuries (there) are mentioned as a customer, recipient or a master. Nerses Archimandrite Bznuni (born in 1839 Karin ), Simon Bznuni bishop of St. Thaddeus Monastery, late 19th-century religious leaders Nerses and Hovhannes archimandrites of Balu province, a participant of Sardarapat battle in 1918 from May 21 to 29, ARF Haroutyun Bznuni, 20th-century Persian-Armenian poet Levon Bznuni and others also come from the Bznuni tribe. Till nowadays there are members of the tribe.

References

Sources
Moses Khorenatsi, «History of Armenia» page 226, Yerevan 1961.
«Iranian-Armenian contemporary writers» from the 1st volume of the book, page 103, Typography   <<Modern>>, Tehran 1964.

External links
History of the Armenians, Moses Khorenats'i. Commentary on the Literary Sources by R. W. Thomson
 Movses of Chorene, "The History of Armenia"

Armenian noble families
Ancient Armenia